Enterolobium schomburgkii is a species of flowering tree in the family Fabaceae.

Names
Enterolobium schomburgkii is also known as "dormidero", because of its minute leaflets reminiscent of Mimosa pudica. Mimosa pudica also called by a similar name ("dormidera").

Distribution
Enterolobium schomburgkii ranges from Central America to the Amazon basin and even further south.

Description
Enterolobium schomburgkii differs from the similar, sympatric, Enterolobium cyclocarpum by smaller and smoother pods, and by its noticeably smaller, and more numerous leaflets. Unlike other species in the genus, seeds are smaller (<1 cm), its wood is reported to be denser than, for instance, Enterolobium cyclocarpum's. and it is reported to bear fruit only every two to three years

References

schomburgkii